The New Vogue dance style is an Australian form of sequence dancing that originated in the 1930s. Since then it has become an important part in the Australian and New Zealand ballroom scene, holding as much importance in social and competition dancing as Latin or International Standard dances.

The Dances 
There are a large number of New Vogue dances, although only a handful are common. All New Vogue dances are based on a sequence of dance steps which are continually repeated, usually until the music ends. They sequences are always either 16 or 32 bars long, and require music that is in turn "sequenced" (composed of verses that are either 16 or 32 bars long). Due to the nature of the dances they are much easier to pick up by beginners than, say, Latin dances (which have numerous types of steps that are combined into custom routines) and as such, beginner dancers are less likely to feel overwhelmed when learning them and can perform the dances to a respectable level within a short time of learning. New Vogue dances can be danced at different levels, with higher levels requiring more precise steps and the addition of arm and torso movement, known as "styling". This in a nutshell makes the dances easy to pick up but hard to master. New Vogue Dances are based on one of several sub categories, including Viennese Waltz Rhythm, Slow Foxtrot Rhythm, March Rhythm and Tango Rhythm.

Competition New Vogue 
Out of the many New Vogue Dances, fifteen are recognised by Dancesport Australia for use in DanceSport competitions. These, and their rhythms, are listed below.

Dancesport Championship Competition Dances
Barclay Blues  -  Slow Foxtrot Rhythm 
Carousel  -  Slow Foxtrot Rhythm
Charmaine  -  Slow Foxtrot Rhythm
Evening Three Step  -  March Rhythm
Excelsior Schottische  -  Slow Foxtrot Rhythm
Gypsy Tap  -  March Rhythm
La Bomba  -  Tango Rhythm
Lucille Waltz  -  Viennese Waltz Rhythm
Merrilyn  -  Slow Foxtrot Rhythm
Parma Waltz  -  Viennese Waltz Rhythm
Swing Waltz  -  Viennese Waltz Rhythm
Tangoette  -  Tango Rhythm
Tango Terrific  -  Tango Rhythm
Tracie Leigh Waltz  -  Viennese Waltz Rhythm
Twilight Waltz  -  Viennese Waltz Rhythm
These dances vary in length and difficulty and as such the harder dances are performed at higher levels.

External links
Official Dancesport
Official Dancesport Approved Syllabus
Waltz Dances - New Vogue

Ballroom dance
Dances of Australia
Dancesport